is a combat flight simulator video game released by Seismic (Asmik Ace Entertainment in Japan) in April 1990 for the Sega Genesis/Mega Drive console.  It is notable as being one of the two first third party published titles for the console in North America. A follow-up, Super Air Diver was released exclusively for the Super Nintendo Entertainment System years later.

Gameplay

This video game is a combat flight simulator similar to After Burner, played in first-person view (from inside the cockpit). The player must pilot the fictional F-119D Stealth Fighter against terrorists operating out of the Middle East, waging a constant battle against U.S. forces and backed by several hostile governments, including the Soviet Union (Although the back of the US package says that the terrorists are backed by extraterrestrial beings). Players must use their stealth capabilities to evade detection and free the globe from torment by  oppressive anti-American regimes.

Boss fights are similar to those in other arcade combat flight simulator games. The player's score is tabulated similarly to games found in video arcades. Missions can take place either during the day or at night.

Reception

Air Diver received mixed to poor reviews. EGM'''s reviewers were perhaps the most positive, giving it decent grades of 6 and 7, praising the detailed art but criticizing the repetitive gameplay and choppy scrolling. French magazine Micro News gave it a "garbage" rating, calling it a "pale copy of After Burner" and "hopelessly, doubtlessly worthless." Similarly, German magazine Power Play said it "looks like a dusty propeller plane" when compared to After Burner'', and "not a good debut for Asmik", rating it 37%.

References

1990 video games
Asmik Ace Entertainment games
Cold War video games
Copya Systems games
Flight simulation video games
Sega Genesis games
Sega Genesis-only games
Video games developed in Japan
Video games set in Africa
Video games set in Asia
Video games set in Europe
Video games set in the Middle East
Video games set in North America
Video games set in South America